Magnus Andersson (born 27 April 1981) is a retired Swedish footballer who played as a defender and current assistant manager of Trelleborgs FF.

Career
Andersson started his career in Hillerstorps GoIF alongside Patrik Ingelsten. In 2001, he moved to IFK Värnamo, but only stayed for 1 season before following manager Jonas Thern to Halmstads BK. Andersson was mainly used as a substitute until the 2005 season, however an ACL injury destroyed his season, and he returned only to obtain the same injury during the 2006 season. 

In 2007, he left Halmstads BK for Trelleborgs FF where he played until he retired in 2017. He continued at the club as assistant manager, after having already been a part of the club's coaching staff since 2015. He came out of retirement on 22 April 2018, due to injuries in the squad, playing the whole game as Trelleborg lost 0–1 to Kalmar FF on home ground. Andersson played two games further in the 2018 season.

References

External links 
 

1981 births
Swedish footballers
Association football midfielders
Allsvenskan players
Superettan players
IFK Värnamo players
Halmstads BK players
Trelleborgs FF players
Living people